Jake Austin Dunning (born August 12, 1988) is an American former professional baseball pitcher. He played for the San Francisco Giants in Major League Baseball (MLB). He is the older brother of Dane Dunning.

Career

Amateur
Dunning attended Indiana University, where he played college baseball for the Indiana Hoosiers baseball team. In 2009, he played collegiate summer baseball with the Hyannis Mets of the Cape Cod Baseball League.

San Francisco Giants
The Giants drafted Dunning in the 33rd round of the 2009 MLB Draft. The Giants added Dunning to their 40-man roster after the 2012 season, and promoted him to the major leagues for the first time on June 14, 2013. Dunning made his MLB debut on June 16, 2013, against the Atlanta Braves. He dedicated his first major league performance to his parents, John and Misu Dunning.

Dunning is the only MLB pitcher to give up two grand slams at Oracle Park (known as AT&T Park at the time), both of them coming during the 2013 season. They were the only two home runs hit against him during his 30-game major league career.

On May 5, 2014, Dunning allowed runners to score on two consecutive wild pitches in a game against the Pittsburgh Pirates.

Dunning signed a minor league deal with the San Francisco Giants for the 2016 season and was invited to spring training.

Chicago White Sox
On February 25, 2017, Dunning signed a minor league deal with the Chicago White Sox. He was released on June 28, 2017.

Long Island Ducks
On July 14, 2017, Dunning signed with the Long Island Ducks of the Atlantic League of Professional Baseball. He re-signed for the 2018 season. Dunning announced his retirement on July 12, 2018.

See also

 Lists of Major League Baseball players

References

External links

1988 births
American baseball players of Korean descent
Arizona League Giants players
Baseball players from Georgia (U.S. state)
Fresno Grizzlies players
Hyannis Harbor Hawks players
Indiana Hoosiers baseball players
Living people
Major League Baseball pitchers
Navegantes del Magallanes players
American expatriate baseball players in Venezuela
Richmond Flying Squirrels players
Sacramento River Cats players
Salem-Keizer Volcanoes players
San Francisco Giants players
San Jose Giants players
Long Island Ducks players
FSC Jacksonville Blue Wave baseball players
Alaska Goldpanners of Fairbanks players